Ormiston is a coastal residential locality in the City of Redland, Queensland, Australia.

Geography
Ormiston is adjacent to the localities of Cleveland and Wellington Point.  The southern half is bisected by the Cleveland railway line with the locality served by Ormiston railway station. 

Empire Point lies on the coast adjacent to Tolston Terrace. 

The border in the west roughly aligns with Hillards Creek.

History

Pre settlement
The Koobenpul lived on the mainland coastal strip stretching from Talwarrapin (Redland Bay) to the mouth of the Mairwar (Brisbane River), including the area now known as Ormiston. Canoe trees and a bora ring from pre-settlement days still remain along Hilliards Creek.

Post settlement

Originally part of the township of Cleveland, early industry included a brickworks established by James Maskell on the eastern bank of Hilliards Creek in 1852 and fellmongery (wool scour) owned by a Thomas Blacket Stephens until the early 1860s. Joseph Clark raised cattle in the district from 1855 until he relinquished the lease in 1858.

Land around Ormiston was bought in 1853 by Captain Louis Hope, a Scottish aristocrat and a founder of the Queensland sugar industry. Hope built Ormiston House from 1858 and 1865 as the centre of a  sugar estate.  Ormiston House is one of the finest examples of colonial architecture in Queensland. 

The property was originally called Woojanness, but was renamed Ormiston after the Hope's family ancestral village of Ormiston, Scotland. It has an ornamental garden that dates from the building of the house. Hope continued with his plantation until 1875, until he lost a dispute over access to his sugar mill and decided to dismantle it. Since the 1960s the house has been a museum. Although the house was called Ormiston, the area around it was still known as Cleveland for many years. When the railway came through the area in 1889, the new railway station and the area around it also became known as Ormiston.

Cleveland West State School opened on 13 April 1872. It was renamed Ormiston State School circa 1900.

Ormiston College opened on 27 January 1988.

The median age of the Ormiston population was 44 years, 7 years above the national median of 37.  67.3% of people living in Ormiston were born in Australia. The other top responses for country of birth were England 9.9%, New Zealand 5.5%, South Africa 3.3%, Scotland 1.6%, Germany 0.8%.  90.8% of people spoke only English at home; the next most common languages were 0.7% German, 0.6% Afrikaans, 0.6% Mandarin, 0.5% Italian, 0.3% Greek.

Heritage listings

Ormiston has a number of heritage-listed sites, including:
 11-13 Empire Vistas: Empire Point foreshore
 56 Hilliard Street: Old Bridge over Hilliards Creek
 Sturgeon Street: Ormiston Fellmongery
 277-295 Wellington Street: Ormiston House Estate
 209-213 Wellington Street: St Andrews Church

Education 
Ormiston State School is a government primary (Prep-6) school for boys and girls at 82-110 Gordon Street. In 2017, the school had an enrolment of 608 students with 45 teachers (38 full-time equivalent) and 23 non-teaching staff (15 full-time equivalent). It includes a special education program.

Ormiston College is a private primary and secondary (Prep-12) school for boys and girls at 97 Dundas Street West. In 2017, the school had an enrolment of 1,279 students with 95 teachers (94 full-time equivalent) and 62 non-teaching staff (47 full-time equivalent).

There is no government secondary school in Ormiston. The nearest government secondary school is Cleveland District State High School in neighbouring Cleveland to the south.

Amenities
Ormiston is home to the Redlands Christian Reformed Church.

Ormison has the Ormiston Redbacks Swim Club (amateur swimming club), the Redlands Softball League and the Redlands Boxing Club.

Attractions 
Ormiston House is open to visitors with tours and events.

Transport 
Ormiston railway station provides access to regular Queensland Rail City network services to Brisbane and Cleveland.

Notable residents 
 John Cameron, built and occupied the house Doobawah in Ormiston 
 Louis Hope, established the Ormiston Estate

References

External links

 

 
Suburbs of Redland City
Coastline of Queensland
Localities in Queensland